Binnya Ran II (Mon: ဗညားရာံ; 1469–1526) the 17th king of the Kingdom of Hanthawaddy in Burma from 1492 to 1526. He was revered for his gentleness although his first act as king was to enforce the massacre of the kinsmen, putting all the royal offspring to death.

During the confusion of Binnya Ran's ascension, Mingyi Nyo of Toungoo who at the time was a vassal of Ava, without King Minkhaung II's permission, sent a probing raid into Hanthawaddy territory. Binnya Ran II sent in a retaliatory raid of the city of Toungoo itself. After the show of force, Hanthawaddy was free of any incursions.

In 1501, he assembled an army of thousands to travel up the Irrawaddy river to pay pilgrimage to the Shwezigon Pagoda at Pagan inside Ava's territory. When the king of Prome, a small kingdom wedged between Ava and Hanthawaddy, checked him, he replied: "I could conquer both you and Ava but I do not wish. I only wish to worship before the Shwezigon". He returned peacefully after having worshiped there.

Family
The king had at least four senior queens in 1495.

The king had at least three sons: Heir-apparent Yazadipati, Taka Yut Pi (Taka Rat Pi), and Smim Htaw.

Historiography

Notes

References

Bibliography
 
 
 
 
 

1469 births
Hanthawaddy dynasty
1526 deaths
15th-century Burmese monarchs
16th-century Burmese monarchs